David Llauradó Caldero is a Spanish Paralympic cycling pilot, who rides at the front of a tandem bicycle.  He has competed at the 2008 and 2012 Summer Paralympics.

Personal 
Llauradó is from the Catalan region of Spain. In 2013, he was awarded the gold Real Orden al Mérito Deportivo.

Cycling 
Llauradó competed at the 2008 Summer Paralympics with  Christian Venge Balboa as his pilot. In 2009, while riding as Venge's guide, he won a gold medal at the IPC Road Cycling World Championships. Llaurado competed at the 2012 Summer Paralympics in cycling as a pilot for Christian Venge Balboa.  The pair won a gold medal in London. From the Catalan region of Spain, he was a recipient of a 2012 Plan ADO scholarship.

References 

Cyclists from Catalonia
Spanish male cyclists
Living people
Paralympic gold medalists for Spain
Paralympic silver medalists for Spain
Cyclists at the 2008 Summer Paralympics
Cyclists at the 2012 Summer Paralympics
Cyclists from Barcelona
Paralympic cyclists of Spain
Plan ADOP alumni
Spanish sighted guides
Cyclists at the 2004 Summer Paralympics
Medalists at the 2004 Summer Paralympics
Medalists at the 2008 Summer Paralympics
Medalists at the 2012 Summer Paralympics
Year of birth missing (living people)
Paralympic medalists in cycling